Yuanshan may refer to these locations:

Taiwan
Yuanshan, Yilan (員山鄉), a township of Yilan County

People's Republic of China

Towns
Yuanshan, Guangdong (元善), in Lianping County, Guangdong
Yuanshan, Jiange County (元山), in Jiange County, Sichuan
Yuanshan, Pingchang County (元山), in Pingchang County, Sichuan